Baegamsan is a mountain in the counties of Hongcheon and Inje, Gangwon-do in South Korea.

See also
List of mountains in Korea

Notes

References

Inje County
Mountains of Gangwon Province, South Korea
Hongcheon County
Mountains of South Korea
One-thousanders of South Korea